The Last Ride is a 1931 American crime film directed by Duke Worne and starring Dorothy Revier, Virginia Brown Faire and Charles Morton.

Cast
 Dorothy Revier as Lita Alvaro
 Virginia Brown Faire as Doris White
 Charles Morton as Roy Smith
 Frank Mayo as Piccardi
 Tom Santschi as Big Boy
 Francis Ford as Brady
 Bobby Dunn as Dink

References

Bibliography
 Alan G. Fetrow. Sound films, 1927-1939: a United States filmography. McFarland, 1992.

External links
 

1931 films
1931 crime films
1930s English-language films
American crime films
Films directed by Duke Worne
Universal Pictures films
American black-and-white films
1930s American films